Thierry Meyssan is a French journalist, conspiracy theorist and political activist.

He is the author of investigations into the extreme right-wing, particularly France's National Front militias, as well as into the Catholic church.

Meyssan's book 9/11: The Big Lie (L'Effroyable imposture) challenges the official account of events of the September 11 terrorist attacks.

Career 
Meyssan is president of the Voltaire Network, which had been a respected independent think tank prior to the publication of 9/11: The Big Lie. His reputation  helped raise his conspiracy theory to prominence.

Meyssan has been noted as using cross-citations of other conspiracy theorists' works in order to lend the appearance of credibility to his ideas. Regarding the events of 9/11, Meyssan cited Webster Tarpley; Tarpley cited David Ray Griffin; and Griffin cited Meyssan.

Publication of The Big Lie 
In 2002, he published a book on the September 11 terrorist attacks, with the English translation titled 9/11: The Big Lie. Meyssan argued that the attacks were organized by a faction of the US military–industrial complex in order to impose a non-democratic regime in the United States and to extend US imperialism. It is one of "the first wave of book-length conspiracy speculations" in France and Germany about 9/11.

A follow up to his first book titled L’effroyable Imposture II (The Big Lie 2) accused Israel of carrying out the assassination of Rafic Hariri.

Response
French media quickly dismissed the contents of the book, and a Pentagon spokesperson also deprecated the book.

In 2005, the U.S. State Department declared Meyssan a persona non grata due to his active promotion of misinformation about the United States.

Works
 La Protection des homosexuels dans le droit européen de Collectif, Projet Ornicar éd. (Paris), 1993, .
 L'Intégration des transsexuels de Collectif, Projet Ornicar éd. (Paris), 1993, .
 Charles Millon, le porte-glaive de Collectif, Golias (Lyon), 1999, .
 L'Énigme Pasqua, Golias (Lyon), 2000, .
 Terrorisme en soutane : Jean-Paul II contre l'IVG par le Réseau Voltaire pour la liberté d'expression, L'Esprit frappeur (Paris), 2000, .
 9/11 The Big Lie, Carnot Publishing (London), 2002, .
 Pentagate, USA Books (New York), 2002, .
 Os Senhores da Guerra, Frenesi (Lisboa), 2002, .
 Foreword (with Jean Ziegler), Le Cartel Bush, Timéli (Genève), 2004, .
 Politicamente Incorrecto, postface by Fidel Castro, Ciencias sociales (Cuba), 2004, .
 Foreword (with José Saramago), El Neron del siglo XXI, Apostrofe (Madrid), 2004, .
 L'Effroyable imposture 1 & Le Pentagate, Nouvelle édition annotée, Demi-lune (Paris), 2007, .
 Resistere alla menzogna in Zero, Perché la versione ufficiale sull'11/9 è un falso (avec Giulietto Chiesa), Piemme (Milan), 2007, .
 L'Effroyable imposture 2. Manipulations et désinformation, Editions Alphée-Jean-Paul Bertrand (Paris), 2007, .
 Before Our Very Eyes, Fake Wars and Big Lies: From 9/11 to Donald Trump, Progressive Press, 2019,

References

Further reading

French author calls for probe into 11 September attacks, Khaleej Times, 9 April 2002.
James S. Robbins 9/11 Denial. The French bestseller and its company, National Review, 9 April 2002.
Did a Plane Hit the Pentagon? French Conspiracy Theorist Claims It Did Not, U.S. Département of State, 28 June 2005.

External links

1957 births
Living people
People from Talence
Radical Party of the Left politicians
21st-century French politicians
French conspiracy theorists
French reporters and correspondents
French gay writers
French LGBT rights activists
9/11 conspiracy theorists
20th-century French LGBT people
21st-century French LGBT people